A number of major crimes in Ireland have attained notability or notoriety due to those involved or their lasting effects on society or legislation. As of 2019, Ireland had the 11th lowest homicide rate in Europe and the 23rd lowest rate globally.

19th century

1880s

20th century

1920s

1940s

1950s

1960s

1970s

1980s

1990s

21st century

2000s

2010s

2020s

References

 
Crimes
Ireland
Crimes, major
Major crimes